Toms River High School may refer to any of three high schools in the Toms River Regional Schools district.

 Toms River High School East, 1225 Raider Way opened in 1979
 Toms River High School North, 1245 Old Freehold Road opened in 1969
 Toms River High School South, 55 Hyers Street dates back to 1891 and was known simply as Toms River High School until North opened